This is a list of banks in Serbia.

Central bank
 National Bank of Serbia

Commercial banks
As of 15 March 2023, there are 21 licensed commercial banks in Serbia. For each of them, there is a balance sheet total from 30 September 2022, and number of employees as of 31 December 2020.

Recent name changes
This is a list of recent (in last five years) name changes of currently active banks due to change of ownership structure:
 On 23 October 2018, VTB Bank changed its name into API Bank a.d. Beograd
 On 10 October 2019, Telenor banka a.d. Beograd changed its name into Mobi Banka a.d. Beograd
 On 27 March 2020, JUBMES banka a.d. Beograd changed its name to Alta banka a.d. Beograd
 On 30 April 2021, Vojvođanska banka a.d. Novi Sad changed its name into OTP Banka Srbija a.d. Novi Sad
 On 19 November 2021, Opportunity banka a.d. Novi Sad changed its name to 3 banka a.d. Beograd
 On 29 April 2022, Komercijalna banka a.d. Beograd changed its name to NLB Komercijalna banka a.d. Beograd

Defunct banks
These are banks that either lost their licence due to the accumulated debts and insolvency, or went into bankruptcy, or merged into another bank:

 Dafiment banka (May 1993)
 Jugoskandik (July 1993)
 BB Slavija banka (October 2001)
 Beogradska banka (January 2002)
 Beobanka (January 2002)
 Jugobanka (January 2002)
 Investbanka (January 2002)
 Borska banka (February 2004)
 Valjevska banka (November 2004)
 JIK banka (April 2005)
 Srpska komercijalna banka (December 2005)
 Control banka (January 2007)
 Medifarm banka (January 2007)
 Zepter banka (May 2007)
 KOMBANKA (June 2007)
 MONTEX banka (July 2007)
 Raj banka (November 2007)
 AIK Banka Senta (January 2008)
 BC BANK CREDIT (May 2008)
 GOLD INTERNACIONAL BANK (October 2008)
 Astra banka (October 2008)
 YUEKIBANKA (January 2009)
 Razvojna banka Vojvodine (2010)
 Agrobanka (May 2012)
 Nova Agrobanka (October 2012)
 Privredna banka (October 2013)
 Univerzal banka (February 2014)
 Findomestic Bank Serbia (November 2016)
 Jubanka (December 2017)
 Jugobanka Jugbanka (April 2018)
 Piraeus Bank Beograd (October 2018)
 Vojvođanska banka (April 2019)
 OTP banka Srbija a.d. (April 2021)
 mts banka (July 2021)
 Direktna Banka (December 2021)
 NLB banka a.d. (April 2022)
 Naša AIK Banka (December 2022)

In process of merging
 RBA bank, bought by parent company of Raiffeisen Bank in August 2021
 Eurobank Direktna, bought by AIK Banka in March 2023

Representative offices of foreign banks 
As of 1 January 2022, these are the registered representative offices of foreign banks within the National Bank of Serbia:
 Atlas Banka, Podgorica, Montenegro
 Citibank, Sioux Falls, USA
 Deutsche Bank, Frankfurt, Germany
 Eximbank, Budapest, Hungary

See also

 Banking in Serbia
 Insurance in Serbia

References

External links
 List of banks in Serbia with SWIFT codes

Serbia

Banks
Serbia